The Salandra II government of Italy held office from 5 November 1914 until 18 June 1916, a total of 591 days, or 1 year, 7 months and 13 days.

Government parties
The government was composed by the following parties:

Composition

References

Italian governments
1915 establishments in Italy
1916 disestablishments in Italy